Ralph Algar was an English politician who was MP for Colchester in October 1383, April 1384, 1385, 1386, and September 1388. He was an alderman, bailiff, and tax collector in Colchester.

References

Bailiffs
Councillors in Essex
Tax collectors
People from Colchester
English MPs October 1383
English MPs April 1384
English MPs 1385
English MPs 1386
English MPs September 1388
14th-century English politicians